Prospero C. Luna (April 20, 1934 – July 23, 2010) was a Filipino character actor whose career extended from the 1960s into the 2000s.

Early life and career
Among his best known performances are a long-running role in the popular Philippines series Buhay Artista.

Among Luna's best known films are three 1968 titles—Swinging Jet–Age, Gigolo–Gigolet–Nagkagulo–Nagkagalit and Buhay Bombero, as well as the title role in the Dolphy comedy Dr. Yes.

Luna emigrated to the United States to live in Oroville, California. In 2008 he featured in the American independent comedy picture Corky's Hot Ice.

Death
He died on July 23, 2010 at the age of 76 due to stroke.

Filmography

Film
 2009 Corky's Hot Ice (Video) 
 2009 Maalaala mo kaya (TV Series) 
 2009  Temiong
 2000 Tatlong puso, iisang pangarap 
 1998 Campus Scandal 
 1995 Run Barbi Run 
 1993 Ingkong: Alpha at Omega 
 1993 Enteng manok: Tari ng Quiapo 
 1993 Home Along da Riles da Movie 
 1992 Dito sa Pitong Gatang 
 1988 Jack & Jill sa Amerika 
 1979 Mahal... Saan ka nanggaling kagabi? 
 1977 John and Marsha '77 
 1976 Ngiti, tawa at halakhak 
 1973 Pugante 
 1972 Ang Boxer at Ang Sexy 
 1972 Batwoman and Robin 
 1972 Sanga-sangang pag-ibig 
 1971 Ika-anim na utos 
 1971 Simbuyo 
 1971 Tukso 
 1970 Tusko 
 1970 Jacobina 
 1969 The Musical Giant 
 1969 Baron Gustavo 
 1969 Mighty Rock 
 1969 Gagamba at si Scorpio 
 1968 Boogaloo 
 1968 Buhay bombero 
 1968 Daredevil 
 1968 Gigolo - Gigolet - Nagkagulo - Nagkagalit 
 1968 Giyera patani 
 1968 Journey to Hell: The Lucky 9 Commandos 
 1968 Swinging Jet-Age 
 1968 The Karate Champions 
 1968 Manila, Open City 
 1967 Alexander Bilis 
 1967 Check Point 
 1967 Kung ano ang puno siya ang bunga 
 1967 Let's Go Merry Go Round 
 1967 Mr. 8 Ball 
 1967 No Read, No Write 
 1967 Pilyo Sa Girls 
 1967 The 12 Golden Commandos 
 1967 Solo Flight 
 1967 Spy Killer 
 1967 Pitong Zapata 
 1967 Buhay artista 
 1966 Shake Baby Shake 
 1966 Sungit Conference (ng pitong dakila) 
 1966 24 Oras (Segment 4)
 1966 Apat na Ipo-Ipo 
 1966 Alyas Don Juan 
 1966 Code Name: Octopus 
 1966 Jack En Poy 
 1966 Nabubuhay sa panganib 
 1966 Chinatown 
 1966 Adyang Batibot 
 1966 Mr. Humble Boy (Ang Dating Kampeon) 
 1966 Napoleon Doble 
 1966 Manang Biday 
 1966 Mr Walastik Laging May Atik 
 1966 Operation Butterball 
 1965 The Sound of Buwisit 
 1965 Humanda Kayo! Leon Sagrado! 
 1965 Zebra 
 1965 Tatlong mabilis 
 1965 Samson at 7 Delaila 
 1965 Tagisan ng mga agimat 
 1965 Dr. Yes 
 1964 Bandong pugante 
 1962 Jikiri 
 1958 Matandang tinale

References

External links

1931 births
2010 deaths
Filipino male comedians
People from Manila
Burials at the Manila North Cemetery
Filipino male film actors